Fiona Joy McDonald (born 22 July 1987) is a former Australian cricketer. A right-handed batter and right-arm fast-medium bowler, she played 35 List A matches for South Australia in the Women's National Cricket League (WNCL) between the 2004–05 and 2010–11 seasons. She also made 15 appearances for South Australia in the Australian Women's Twenty20 Cup.

References

External links
 
 

1987 births
Living people
Australian cricketers
Australian women cricketers
Cricketers from Adelaide
Sportswomen from South Australia
South Australian Scorpions cricketers